San Pedro y San Pablo de Patale was a Spanish Franciscan mission built in the early 17th century in the Florida Panhandle, six miles east of Tallahassee, Florida. It was part of Spain's effort to colonize the region, and convert the Timucuan and Apalachee Indians to Christianity. The mission lasted until 1704, when it was captured by a militia of Creek Indians and South Carolinians.

The site where the mission stood was added to the U.S. National Register of Historic Places on June 26, 1972.

See also
Spanish missions in Florida

References

External links
 Leon County listings at National Register of Historic Places
 Florida's Office of Cultural and Historical Programs
 Leon County listings 
 Leon County markers

Spanish missions in Florida
National Register of Historic Places in Leon County, Florida
Properties of religious function on the National Register of Historic Places in Florida
History of Leon County, Florida